Giant Marsh is a wetland made up of mud flats, and tidal flats on the eastern San Francisco Bay in Richmond, Northern California. The marsh is currently part of the Point Pinole Regional Shoreline.

Description
The marsh is located on the western coast of Richmond near the city's landfill between San Pablo Creek Marsh and Breuner Marsh. The wetland area has been damaged by erosion, pollution, and other human activities.

Giant Marsh is named after the Giant Powder Company, the first black powder manufacturer in the U.S., which operated on the point to the north of the marsh for over 50 years.

See also
Giant, Richmond, California

References

Landforms of Contra Costa County, California
East Bay Regional Park District
Marshes of California
Wetlands of the San Francisco Bay Area